The Three Musketeers is a 1986 Australian made-for-television animated adventure film from Burbank Films Australia. It is based on Alexandre Dumas's classic 1844 French novel, The Three Musketeers, and was adapted by Keith Dewhurst. It was produced by Tim Brooke-Hunt and featured original music by Sharon Calcraft.

Although chronologically the story is followed in Burbank's The Man in the Iron Mask, the latter film was released a year before The Three Musketeers. The copyright for the film is now owned by Pulse Distribution and Entertainment and administered by digital rights management firm NuTech Digital.

This is the only time in any Burbank production that the characters Break the fourth wall. Now and then, the characters suddenly address the audience as if they were in the scene with them.

Plot 
In France during the mid-17th century, Cardinal Richelieu receives a visit from the despicably charming young woman, Milady de Winter.  Milady brings the Cardinal information regarding the notorious affair between the queen of France and the English Duke of Buckingham.  Outside their window, the queen's seamstress, Constance Bonacieux, stands watching the conversation between the two characters, when she is attacked by Rochefort, one of the Cardinal's loyal men. She is rescued by the young musketeer d'Artagnan and taken away to his abode, where Constance briefly explains her troubles and asks for d'Artagnan's help.

Cardinal Richelieu, wanting to convince King Louis XIII that his wife, the queen, is unfaithful to him and in love with the Duke of Buckingham, suggests that he should ask his wife to wear the diamonds he had given her for an upcoming ball. The queen, shocked and dismayed, confesses to Constance that she had sent the diamonds to the Duke of Buckingham, and her confidant goes to d'Artagnan for help. With the help of his companions, three of the finest musketeers in France, Athos, Porthos and Aramis, d'Artagnan makes his way to England to seek the Duke himself, so that he may recover the diamonds and restore the queen's honor.

Still, when all problems seem overcome, the English Duke of Buckingham plans to invade France, remove King Louis XIII and marry the queen; on the other hand, Cardinal Richelieu and Milady want revenge on d'Artagnan and Buckingham. Milady orders Rochefort to kidnap Constance Bonacieux, and when d'Artagnan learns this he sets off to rescue her. Milady is captured by Buckingham, and orders Felton to guard her.  Felton falls in love with Milady; she seduces him and asks him to murder the Duke, which he does. Though she believes herself safe at a convent, Constance receives a visit from her supposed benefactor, Milady de Winter, who poisons her; d'Artagnan arrives at the scene and she dies in his arms. Together with Athos, Porthos and Aramis, d'Artagnan corners Milady and she is captured and sentenced to die for her crimes; Milady is then revealed to be Athos' own wife. The villains defeated and the country's honor restored, the four companions return to their homeland mourning the lives lost but cheering for their triumphs.

See also 
 The Three Musketeers
 Alexandre Dumas, père
 Burbank Films Australia
 List of films in the public domain in the United States

References

External links 
 
 
 The Three Musketeers at the Big Cartoon DataBase

1986 films
1986 animated films
Australian children's animated films
1980s adventure films
Films based on The Three Musketeers
Films set in the 1620s
Films set in France
Films set in Paris
Animated films based on novels
Cultural depictions of Cardinal Richelieu
Cultural depictions of Louis XIII
1980s Australian animated films
Television shows based on The Three Musketeers
1980s English-language films